The Secretary of Agriculture and Forestry is a member of the Virginia Governor's Cabinet.  The office is currently vacant pending confirmation of Secretary-designate Matt Lohr's nomination.

Background
The Virginia Secretariat of Agriculture and Forestry was created in 2004. It oversees the Virginia Department of Agriculture and Consumer Services and the Virginia Department of Forestry. Governor Mark Warner appointed former Delegate Robert Bloxom as the first secretary.

List of Secretaries of Agriculture

References

External links
 Virginia Secretary of Agriculture and Forestry

2004 establishments in Virginia
Government agencies established in 2004
Agriculture
Agriculture and Forestry